MegMac (also stylised as "MEGMAC") is the self-titled debut extended play (EP) by Australian indie pop artist Meg Mac. It was released on 12 September 2014. The EP contains four original songs and a cover of Bill Withers' “Grandma's Hands”.

The EP was nominated for Best Female Artist at the ARIA Music Awards of 2015 but lost to Sometimes I Sit and Think, and Sometimes I Just Sit by Courtney Barnett.

The EP was certified platinum in Australia in 2018.

Background

Interest for Meg Mac commenced in 2013 following the release of her debut single “Known Better”, which was played on Triple J.  The second single called “Every Lie” was released on 13 November 2013
The song saw her win the Triple J Unearthed spot at Falls Festival in Lorne, as well as being named a 2014 Next Crop artist.
The third single “Roll Up Your Sleeves” was released in July 2014  is a letter from Meg Mac to Meg Mac, and a literal reminder that everything really is going to be alright. The song gave Mac her first ARIA charting single, peaking at 80 in August 2015  The MegMac EP was announced in August 2014.

Much of the record comprises hooks and riffs she wrote as a teenager or while studying music at the Western Australian Academy of Performing Arts  in Perth.

Reception
Johnny Nail from Rolling Stone Australia described the EP as ‘a combination of Americana blues and dramatic pop’ adding “she's clearly comfortable in her own communication; a definition that instantly makes her music vastly more engaging that the re-traced templates of over-exaggerated extravagance, twee delicacy and anthemic breakdowns pursued by her adversaries.”

Track listing
 Roll Up Your Sleeves -  (3:05)
 Turning - (3:42)
 Grandma's Hands - (4:03)
 Every Lie - (3:13)
 Known Better - (3:06)

Certifications

Release history

References

2014 debut EPs
Meg Mac albums
Indie pop EPs
Synth-pop EPs
EPs by Australian artists